Hemingway House may refer to:

Cuba 
Finca Vigía, Ernest Hemingway's house in Havana

United States 
Hemingway House and Barn (Fayetteville, Arkansas), listed on the National Register of Historic Places (NRHP) in Washington County
Hemingway House (Little Rock, Arkansas), listed on the NRHP in Little Rock

Associated with Ernest Hemingway 
Birthplace of Ernest Hemingway, Ernest Hemingway's birthplace and childhood home
Ernest Hemingway Cottage, Walloon Lake, Michigan, NRHP-listed, Hemingway family's summer retreat
Pfeiffer House and Carriage House, Piggott, Arkansas, Ernest Hemingway's residence in the late 1920's
Ernest Hemingway House, Key West, Florida, NRHP-listed, also known as Hemingway House & Museum, Ernest Hemingway's home in the 1930's
Hotel Ambos Mundos, Havana, Cuba, Ernest Hemingway's residence in the 1930's
Finca Vigía, Havana, Cuba, Ernest Hemingway's home in the 1940's and 50's
Ernest and Mary Hemingway House, Ketchum, Idaho, NRHP-listed, Ernest Hemingway's final home